Garus, or Ate (cf. neighboring and closely related Garuh, or Nobonob, and its dialect Ati), is a Papuan language of Papua New Guinea.

References

Hanseman languages
Languages of Madang Province